ˌ

Cedar High School, also known as Cedar City High School or CHS, is a public high school in Cedar City, Utah, United States.

History 
Cedar High School was founded in September 1940. The school building was located on Center Street and 300 West.  It was designed to house 350 students and became overcrowded as the student body grew to 500. It was torn down in 2000 to make room for a parking lot. (Cedar High School was never part of Branch Agricultural College, which was across the street from the original High School location.) 

The school was founded in 1941 and incorporated high school students from Cedar City and the surrounding area. In 1942 CHS got its mascot under President Jay Thorley. Cedar High School belongs to the Iron County School District.  The current building was completed for the 1963-1964 Academic year, and was extremely modern for the time. The Building has undergone several expansions over the years. The most recent expansion was completed in 2010, and includes a new commons area, state-of-the-art band room, and an all new counseling center. Current enrollment is approximately 1100. 

Until 1997 Cedar High was the city's only secondary school; for many decades its students participated in a fierce rivalry with Dixie High School in St. George, Utah (another one-high school town until the 1980s). For the past decade the hometown rivals have been the Canyon View High School Falcons.

Sports
CHS sports include baseball, basketball, cheerleading, cross country, football, golf, Mohey Tawa (drill team), soccer, softball, swimming, tennis, track, volleyball, water polo and wrestling.

The boys' basketball team won their first 2A State championship in 1975. They won the 3A Utah State Basketball Championship in 1994 and 1995. The boys' baseball team  won the 3A Utah State Champtionship in 1975.

Notable alumni
 Ally Condie - author of the New York Times bestseller Matched
 Michael O. Leavitt - Governor of Utah and Secretary of Health and Human Services
 John Ursua - professional football player for the Seattle Seahawks

Mascot controversy
In early 2019, the Iron County School Board was asked to reconsider the school's mascot "The Redmen." The board formed an advisory committee to investigate the change. After the committee voted 17-2 to change the mascot, the school board voted 3–2 in favor of retiring the mascot. Cedar High School students later selected "Reds" as a replacement.

References

External links

 

Public high schools in Utah
Schools in Iron County, Utah
Educational institutions established in 1940
1940 establishments in Utah